The country's Catholic bishops met in the Conference of Catholic Bishops of Zimbabwe (Zimbabwe Catholic Bishops' Conference, ZCBC), established by the Holy See on October 1, 1969. The statutes of the Conference were approved on March 25, 1981.

The ZCBC is a member of the Inter-Regional Meeting of Bishops of Southern Africa (IMBISA) and Symposium of Episcopal Conferences of Africa and Madagascar (SECAM).

The primary objective of the ZCBC is to promote solidarity among the bishops of Zimbabwe, and promotion of self-sufficiency among each of the dioceses.

Presidents 

 Donal Lamont, Bishop of Umtali (1970–1972)
 Aloysius Haene, Bishop of Gwelo (1972–1974)
 Ignacio Prieto Vega, Bishop of Wankie (1974–1975)
 Ernst Heinrich Karlen, Archbishop of Bulawayo (1975–1977)
 Patrick Fani Chakaipa, Archbishop of Harare (1977–1984)
 Wunganayi Chiginya Tobias, Bishop of Gweru (1984–1987)
 Alexio Churu Muchabaiwa, Bishop of Mutare (1987–1990)
 Helmut Reckter, Bishop of Chinhoyi (1990–1994)
 Francis Xavier Mugadzi, Bishop of Gweru (1994–1998)
 Alexio Churu Muchabaiwa, Bishop of Mutare (1998–2002)
 Michael Dixon Bhasera, Bishop of Masvingo (2002–2006)
 Robert Ndlovu, Archbishop of Harare (2006–2011)
 Ángel Floro Martínez, Bishop of Gokwe (2011–2014)
 Michael Dixon Bhasera, Bishop of Masvingo (2014–present)

References

External links
 ZCBC
 GCatholic
 Catholic Hierarchy 

Zimbabwe
Catholic Church in Zimbabwe

it:Chiesa_cattolica_in_Zimbabwe#Conferenza_episcopale